The Play On Tour was the second headlining tour by American country music singer Carrie Underwood, in support of her third studio album Play On. The first legs which contains dates only in North America, were announced on December 10, 2009. The second leg was announced on April 16, 2010. Tickets went on sale on April 24, 2010.

Underwood announced that 36 cents from each ticket sale would be donated to the Save the Children program, inspired by a line in her song "Change" from the Play On album.

In July 2010, Pollstar.com revealed the Top 100 tours of the first half of the year for North American statistics. The "Play On Tour" clocked in at number fifteen, bringing in a total of $18.4 million. It brought in a collective total of more than 375,000 tickets in its first four months.
In December 2010, Pollstar.com revealed the Top 50 tours of 2010 for both North American and worldwide statistics. The "Play On Tour" clocked in at number nineteen on the North American ranking, and number thirty-one worldwide.

In December 2010, Billboard ranked the Play On Tour at number twenty-four for all tours of 2010. On January 4, 2011, official statistics revealed that Underwood played to over one million fans throughout the tour, becoming her largest tour to date.

Opening acts
Sons of Sylvia 
Lady Antebellum 
Craig Morgan 
Billy Currington

Setlist
"Cowboy Casanova"
"Quitter"
"Wasted"
"I Know You Won't"
"Some Hearts"
"Just a Dream"
"Temporary Home"
"There's a Place for Us" 
"Someday When I Stop Loving You"
"All-American Girl"
"So Small"
"Take Me Home, Country Roads"
"This Time"
"Undo It"
"Jesus, Take the Wheel"/"How Great Thou Art"
"What Can I Say?" 
"Change"
"I Told You So" 
"Mama's Song"
"Last Name"
 
Encore: "Play On Video Segue"
"Before He Cheats"
"Songs Like This" (excerpts from "White Liar" and "Single Ladies (Put a Ring On It)")

Fan club member's choice
From March 11 to April 14, Underwood covered a song from one of four genres (Rock, '90's Country, '80's, and Classic Country) based on how fans voted. The winner for each city was revealed and performed during that night's show of the Play On Tour.

Reading, Pennsylvania on March 11, 2010 – "Summer Of '69" – Rock
Albany, New York on March 12, 2010 – "Home Sweet Home" – Rock
Providence, Rhode Island on March 13, 2010 – "Chasin' That Neon Rainbow" (duet with Craig Morgan) – 90's Country
Portland, Maine on March 15, 2010 – "9 to 5" – 80's
Bridgeport, Connecticut on March 16, 2010 – "9 to 5" – 80's
Atlantic City, New Jersey on March 19, 2010 – "Summer Of '69" – Rock
Mashantucket, Connecticut on March 20, 2010 - "Stand By Your Man" - Classic Country
Worcester, Massachusetts on March 21, 2010 – "Home Sweet Home" – Rock
Hamilton, Ontario on March 23, 2010 - "Stand By Your Man" - Classic Country
Ottawa, Ontario on March 24, 2010 – "Summer Of '69" – Rock
Trenton, New Jersey on March 26, 2010 – "Sweet Child o' Mine" – Rock
Amherst, Massachusetts on March 27, 2010 – "Summer Of '69" – Rock
Wilkes-Barre, Pennsylvania on March 29, 2010 - "Stand By Your Man"- Classic Country
Rochester, New York on March 31, 2010 – "9 to 5" – 80's
Pittsburgh, Pennsylvania on April 1, 2010 – "Livin' on the Edge" – Rock
Pikeville, Kentucky on April 3, 2010 – "Don't Rock the Jukebox" (duet with Craig Morgan) – 90's Country
Columbus, Ohio on April 6, 2010 – "Don't Rock the Jukebox" (duet with Craig Morgan) – 90's Country
Peoria, Illinois on April 7, 2010 – "Summer Of '69" – Rock
Indianapolis, Indiana on April 9, 2010 – "Home Sweet Home"- Rock
Rockford, Illinois on April 10, 2010 – "Don't Rock the Jukebox" (duet with Craig Morgan) – 90's Country
Ft Wayne, Indiana on April 12, 2010 – "9 to 5" – 80's
Saginaw, Michigan on April 13, 2010 – "Summer Of '69" – Rock
East Lansing, Michigan on April 14, 2010 – "Paradise City" – Rock

Tour dates

 A^ This show was co-headlined with Brad Paisley.
 B^ This show was originally scheduled to be held in Billings, but due to tornado damage at the selected venue, the show was cancelled, and later changed to Bismarck.

Festivals & Events

Box office score data

Awards and nominations

Tour preparation
The tour was reportedly being rehearsed in Mobile, Alabama for two weeks behind locked and tightly sealed doors to keep all hints and clues about the tour completely unknown. Underwood was spotted with stage crew and 6 semi-trucks hauling stage props and pieces to the arena the tour was being rehearsed in. Underwood reportedly paid a near $500,000 for the stage preparation. 
In interviews, Underwood stated that there will be a lot of "moving parts" on the stage. During the show, she swings from vines, gets transported and lifted across the arena audience while standing in the bed of a large blue pickup truck, has interchangeable backgrounds for the stage backdrop, a lifting stage piece, and does a virtual duet with Randy Travis from what appears to be the stage of the Grand Ole Opry, performing her Grammy-Award-winning collaboration "I Told You So".

Crew member's death
On Saturday, March 20, crew members were carrying Underwood's set pieces from Atlantic City, New Jersey to Mashantucket, Connecticut for her show that day in semi-trucks when a trailer truck driving northbound on the opposite side of the medians began to lose control of the vehicle, causing the trailer truck to slide into the median for approximately 400 feet. Eventually, the trailer truck crashed through the separator, slashing open the semi-truck's fuel engine. The crash ignited a large fire, causing the driver of the semi-truck to lose all control of the vehicle. The truck crashed down a large hill and eventually landed in flames on the Interstate 95 running through Stonington, Connecticut. The fire was contained, but the entire truck was horribly charred, including the body of the driver. The body was unable to be identified through body or DNA identification, so officials resorted to using dental records. The driver, Robert Allen O'Bleness, was a native of Wichita, Kansas. He was 48 years old at the time of his death.
In the Mashantucket concert, Underwood paid tribute to the lost employee by belting out a tearful version of her hit single "Temporary Home", also stating that the song "gives off a whole new meaning from its previous one."

References 

2010 concert tours
2011 concert tours
Carrie Underwood concert tours